Larry Allen (born 1971) is a former American football player.

Larry Allen may also refer to:

 Larry Allen (journalist), journalist; see J. Frank Diggs
 Larry Allen, founder of Learning Technology Partners
 Larry Allen, member of American R&B vocal group The Modulations

See also
Lawrence Allen (disambiguation)
Laurence Allen (disambiguation)
Laurie Allen (disambiguation)